Kangaroo Flat may refer to several places in Australia:
 Kangaroo Flat, Victoria, a suburb of Bendigo
 Kangaroo Flat, South Australia, northwest of Gawler